The 2014 Davis Cup World Group Play-offs were held from 12 to 14 September. They were the main play-offs of the 2014 Davis Cup. Winners of the playoffs advanced to the 2015 World Group, and the losers were relegated to their respective Zonal Regions I.

Teams
Bold indicates team has qualified for the 2015 Davis Cup World Group.

 From World Group
 
 
 
 
 
 
 
 

 From Americas Group I

 
 

 From Asia/Oceania Group I

 
 

 From Europe/Africa Group I

Results summary
Date: 12–14 September

The eight losing teams in the World Group first round ties and eight winners of the Zonal Group I final round ties competed in the World Group Play-offs for spots in the 2015 World Group.  The draw took place on April 8 in London.

Seeded teams

 
 
 
 
 
 
 
 

Unseeded teams

 
 
 
 
 
 
 
 

Note: Due to security concerns, the International Tennis Federation Board of Directors decided to move the World Group play-off ties originally scheduled to be held in Israel and Ukraine.  Israel and Ukraine exercised their option of nominating neutral venues for their ties against Argentina and Belgium, respectively.

Playoff results

India vs. Serbia

Brazil vs. Spain

Israel vs. Argentina

Canada vs. Colombia

United States vs. Slovakia

Australia vs. Uzbekistan

Netherlands vs. Croatia

Ukraine vs. Belgium

References

World Group Play-offs